"It's Over Now" is a song by Canadian singer Deborah Cox. It was written by Keir "KayGee" Gist, Taura Stinson, Alonzo Jackson, and DeMone Griffin for her second studio album One Wish (1998), while production was overseen by KayGee and Jackson. Released as the album's second following the major success of "Nobody's Supposed to Be Here", it became a moderate commercial success on the charts, peaking at number 20 on Billboard's US Hot R&B/Hip-Hop Songs, while becoming her third consecutive and fourth overall number one hit on the Dance Club Songs.

The song has been sampled several times, including "It's Over Now" by Big Ang featuring Siobhan in 2005 (UK # 29), "Watchin'" by Freemasons featuring Amanda Wilson in 2006 (UK #19) and "Lies" by Burns in 2012 (UK #32).

Charts

References

1998 songs
1999 singles
Deborah Cox songs
Songs written by Taura Stinson
Songs written by KayGee